Rotthalmünster (Central Bavarian: Rotthalmünsta) is a municipality in the district of Passau in Bavaria in Germany.

Notable people
 Konrad Dobler, German athlete

References

Passau (district)